The men's 1500 metres was an event at the 1984 Summer Olympics in Los Angeles, California. The final was held on August 11, 1984. Fifty-nine athletes from 40 nations competed. The maximum number of athletes per nation had been set at 3 since the 1930 Olympic Congress. The event was won by Sebastian Coe of Great Britain, the first man to successfully defend an Olympic 1500 metres title. Steve Cram's silver made it the first time a nation had gone 1–2 in the event since Great Britain had done it in 1920. José Manuel Abascal's bronze was Spain's first medal in the event.

Summary

From the start Omar Khalifa went to the lead, shadowed by Joseph Chesire with Sebastian Coe marking their lead in third.  The first lap was 58.85.  500 metres into the race, Steve Scott ran around the leaders to take the point, Coe and José Manuel Abascal stringing out the field.  They passed the 800 metre mark in a slightly faster 1:56.81.  Abascal continued to speed up, passing Coe then Scott between 900 and 1000.  Scott began to fall back through the field as Steve Cram and Steve Ovett moved forward.  At the bell the three Brits were 2–4, three Steves were 3–5.  Midway through the penultimate turn, suddenly the world record holder Ovett stepped inside of the curb and stopped.  With 300 to go in an even faster 2:53.21, Abascal, Coe and Cram had three metres on Cheshire who accelerated around Scott and Jim Spivey as Ovett dropped out.  Cram accelerated down the back stretch, Coe reacting, with about 220 metres to go, the leaders were three abreast across the track.  Coe emerged ahead into the turn with Cram sprinting in his wake.  Coe looked around to see where his competition was then focused on holding his position.  Coming off the turn, Coe checked again, seeing Cram still a metre behind him, breaking away from Abascal.  Coe sprinted away from Cram, checking again mid-straightaway to be sure his work was accomplished, then extending his lead to 6 metres by the finish.  Cram had another 7 metres on Abascal who was able to hold off Cheshire for bronze.  Coe became the only man to successfully defend his title in the 1500 metres.  Coe turned back toward the press area and angrily showed them his index finger on both hands, indicating he was number one again.  Still fresh after running less than 2 seconds off the world record, Coe jogged back still looking at that area of the stands and again showing his number one finger.

Background

This was the 20th appearance of the event, which is one of 12 athletics events to have been held at every Summer Olympics. The only 1980 finalists to return were the three British runners: gold medalist Sebastian Coe, bronze medalist Steve Ovett, and eighth-place finisher Steve Cram. Coe and Ovett had been favorites then, with Cram not considered quite so highly; by 1984, however, they were a true triumvirate (with Cram winning the 1982 Commonwealth and European Championships and the inaugural 1983 World Championship; Ovett had set the world record in 1983; Coe was the defending Olympic champion) and a threat to sweep the podium. Their main competition was Steve Scott of the United States, who had been prevented from running at the 1980 Games due to the American-led boycott; Scott had taken second to Cram at the 1983 Worlds. Johan Fourie did not compete because of South Africa's apartheid ban.

Antigua and Barbuda, Equatorial Guinea, the Gambia, Guyana, Jordan, Niger, Oman, Rwanda, the Seychelles, Suriname, the United Arab Emirates, and Zimbabwe each made their first appearance in the event. The United States made its 19th appearance, most of all nations (having missed only the boycotted 1980 Games).

Competition format

The competition was again three rounds (used previously in 1952 and since 1964). The "fastest loser" system introduced in 1964 was used for both the first round and semifinals. The 9-man semifinals and finals from 1976 and 1980 were replaced with 12-man races.

There were six heats in the first round, each with 10 or 11 runners (before withdrawals). The top three runners in each heat, along with the next six fastest overall, advanced to the semifinals. The 24 semifinalists were divided into two semifinals, each with 12 runners. The top four men in each semifinal, plus the next four fastest overall, advanced to the 12-man final.

Records

These were the standing world and Olympic records prior to the 1984 Summer Olympics.

Sebastian Coe set a new Olympic record at 3:32.53 in the final.

Schedule

All times are Pacific Daylight Time (UTC-7)

Results

Round 1

Heat 1

Heat 2

Heat 3

Heat 4

Heat 5

Heat 6

Semifinals

Semifinal 1

Semifinal 2

Final

See also
 1982 Men's European Championships 1500 metres (Athens)
 1983 Men's World Championships 1500 metres (Helsinki)
 1984 Men's Friendship Games 1500 metres (Moscow)
 1986 Men's European Championships 1500 metres (Stuttgart)
 1987 Men's World Championships 1500 metres (Rome)

References

External links
 Results
 Results

 
1500 metres at the Olympics
Men's events at the 1984 Summer Olympics